Hyman Goldstein (1876 – 3 September 1928) was an Australian politician. He was a Nationalist member of the New South Wales Legislative Assembly, representing Eastern Suburbs from 1922 until 1925, and Coogee from 1927 to his death in 1928. Federal Nationalist MP Thomas Ley, an enemy of Goldstein's who was later convicted of murder in England, is often held responsible for his death.

Background
Goldstein was born in London, to tailor Solomon Goldstein and his wife Hannah, formerly Cohen. Arriving in Australia in 1888, he was educated at Crown Street Public School, before becoming a businessman. He married Olive Hopkins, with whom he had two sons, in 1903. 

In 1922, he was elected as one of the five members for Eastern Suburbs in the New South Wales Legislative Assembly, but he was defeated at the state election three years later. He returned to Parliament as the member for Coogee after the end of proportional representation in 1927.

Death
Goldstein was a shareholder in the Prickly Pear Company, which had been organised by former New South Wales Justice Minister and federal MP Thomas Ley. The company's failure had been preceded by Ley selling all of his shares. Goldstein, one of many shareholders who had lost their investments when the company collapsed, began a campaign against Ley, but was subsequently found dead after a fall from the Coogee cliffs. Although it was ruled a case of accidental death, there are grounds for believing that he had been killed at Ley's behest; by this time Ley was already suspected of having done away with his federal predecessor Frederick McDonald (who disappeared in 1926) and with Keith Greedor, a business associate who had drowned in 1928 after having launched an investigation into Ley's business practices. The Goldstein Reserve at Coogee Beach is named after him.

See also
List of unsolved murders

References

 

1876 births
1926 deaths
Accidental deaths from falls
Assassinated Australian politicians
Australian people of German-Jewish descent
British emigrants to Australia
English Jews
English people of German-Jewish descent
Jewish Australian politicians
Male murder victims
Mayors of Randwick
Members of the New South Wales Legislative Assembly
Nationalist Party of Australia members of the Parliament of New South Wales